Jean Gaudreau (born May 27, 1964) is a Canadian artist, painter and engraver in the province's capital (Capitale-Nationale).

In 2008, he was shown as one of the figures of Quebec's contemporary art scene by Robert Lepage during the celebrations for the 400th anniversary of the foundation of Quebec City. In his animated film Le Moulin à images, Lepage projected images of artworks by Gaudreau next to works from Jean-Paul Lemieux, Martin Bureau, Jean-Paul Riopelle and Alfred Pellan, among others, on grain silos located in Anse au Foulon, in Quebec City's old port.

Biography 
Gaudreau was born in Quebec City. At 10 years old, his mother, Claudia Tremblay, a plastic art teacher, musician and painter, entrusted her son to Sister Alice Pruneau to teach him the basics of drawing, at the Séminaire des Pères Maristes in Quebec City. As a child, he learned the "old fashioned way'’ the Mezzotint as well as the importance of geometry in drawing. Indeed, Pruneau teaches him the rules of perspective, the vanishing points as well as the Golden Triangle.  The painter's mother also played a dominant role in the apprenticeship of her son's plastic practices. She herself would become Jean Palardy's student.

Between Tradition and Modernity (1974–1985) 
When he was 12 years old, Gaudreau painted genre art scenes in Quebec's old port. His first subjects were the stevedores, the boats, the docks, the river and in the background, the buildings on Quebec City's headland, the cap Diamant. He outlined, in the manner of the countryside landscape painters, the contours of the old buildings. The Château Frontenac, the Séminaire de Québec, Price Building, are some favourite subjects of the teenager.

Isle-aux-Coudres 
Until 1985, the paintings or rural landscapes in Charlevoix were a curiosity item for denizens and tourists of L'Isle-aux-Coudres. The summers of the artist's youth were spent painting landscapes and his paintings were sold outside a hotel of the island. It was a significant period for the teenager, who regularly visited Jean Paul Lemieux. The older man was always ready to underline to Gaudreau the importance of drawing in the practice of painting. "At 17 years old, Jean Gaudreau presents his first solo exhibition in an art gallery, and he has since been seen regularly in solo or group exhibitions. Hundreds of his paintings were acquired by private or public collections, and several mural painting experiments will give way to more important commissions."

The Artist's Approach 
Painter, sculptor and engraver, the artist explores several technical means and approaches them not separately like so many individuated vehicles of expression, but rather like a gathering of manners, a single whole body. The artist borrows his iconography from the circus's syntax, the grammatical codes of dance and the plastic arts' vocabulary.

"Chance encounters and the very spirit of his artistic production have led Gaudreau to associate, for many years, dance and performance art to his painting. Both by the themes he tackles and in the conception of the many events he put together, the body has become a central element of his work. In his compositions, the artist plays with elaborate staging, where characters borrowed from the circus and the dance world, sometimes moving other times remaining still, blend into various forms to create an open and animated space. Colour, thus far confined to a supporting role, becomes in this series, an essential foundation of the ensemble, without, however, falling into a purely decorative dimension. A particularly effective accomplice, it acts as a trigger."

The use of the epithet multidisciplinary to introduce this creator, merges with the appropriate cross-disciplinary one. Gaudreau sculpts the raw matter in a diligent manner, a rigour born of a workshop experience, bending his back, kneading the surfaces and twisting the supports. This labour demonstrates his mastering of colour combinations, impressionist gesture and, above all, his careful attention towards the planarity of the canvas. The artist cannot stand the lightness of emptiness, or the mundane of everyday life. The large canvases shown in 2003 in the Cirque du Soleil's headquarters bear witness to this; loaded surfaces, busy, choked, bruised and nervously piled.

"Through M-515, Jean Gaudreau has etched the profile of a chalky face marred by the end of the day glowing tears on the crimson hue of a quivering sea. A long line stretched between two moribund abandoned in a vacuum, toggles this head in the nocturnal strangeness of the world.

The thick strokes of blue, red or yellow are childhood memories, landscape from within, pieces of history, in short, Quebec City-specific colours. "If, like says artist Leng Hong, "painting the body's landscapes or painting the skin of dreams is always sketching our interior landscape," then Gaudreau's interior landscape is rather fascinating. The elements of his work, parts taken from the universal subconscious, assemble deftly on the canvas like a puzzle."

He constantly revisits, almost with obstinacy, this welcoming and volcanic maelstrom, by stacking up material layers, painting gestures, delicate sketches, violent strokes, controlled soft hedges, visual oxymorons characterized by fine droplets or by harsh movements, articulated by a swift arm.

"He is without a doubt, a singular figure of the Quebec visual arts world. Firstly, because he has a lot of grits and boldness. Also, and especially because he earns a living with his painting, which is in itself quite exceptional. He has surrounded himself with patrons, collectors and art enthusiasts. His artwork travels to Vancouver, Toronto, Montreal and New York galleries. He earns a living with his art, but let us be clear. He has chosen this frugal and precarious way of life like so many other creators. Jean Gaudreau defines his painting as intuitive. His approach favours emotion, subjectivity, even the expression of the 'unconscious.' He is also inspired by dance and movement; his painting is therefore very gestural."

"The brush strokes recall Riopelle, Pollock, Stella, Klimt and Ferron; some traces evoke the Automatists and the flights dear to the lyrical abstracts. Admittedly, the artist avails himself of a postmodernism that tends to integrate all streams as bare witnesses the presence of figurative and non-figurative elements, women with lascivious faces, sinuous lines and the juxtaposition of vibrant hues and gilding. The predominant gestural as well as the intentionally less than finished and more primary aspect of his painting constitute trials at forging a personal style."

Second life 
Jean Gaudreau started his exploration of copper with the help of remains of the South turret of the Château Frontenac. After mastering the transformation technic of these pieces, that artist embedded them in his paintings thus giving them a second life.

"By using a material out of the past—the copper—transforming it into a contemporary character, the artist explores what could be described as the point of metamorphosis of the medium, trying to answer questions such as 'What happens when these remains begin a new life?' ‘What happens when the past and the present become one and the same?' Asked about his choice of the iconography of the heart as subjects in his recent creation, Jean Gaudreau states: 'I have chosen the shape of the heart, timeless symbol of love, to express this transition between past and present. Past and presents are the two beats of a same heart.'"

Video Documents 
 Belco, J: Jean Gaudreau – Environnement de création, 2010
 Lacerte, Louis: Jean Gaudreau – Moulin à images, 2014
 Roberge, Josiane: Balise du Temps, 2015
 Roberge, Josiane: Court métrage – Tambours flambeaux, 201

Private and Public Collections 
 Musée du Bas-Saint-Laurent
 Cirque du Soleil
 Québécor Média
 Loto Québec
 Feel Europe Group
 Quebec City
  Laval University
  Sherbrooke University
 Groupe TVA
 Alcan Canada
 TD Bank
 Premier Tech
 Laurier Museum

References

Bibliography 
 
 
 
 
 
 

1964 births
Living people
20th-century Canadian artists
21st-century Canadian artists
Artists from Quebec City
Canadian engravers
Canadian painters
Canadian photographers
Canadian sculptors
Canadian male sculptors
French Quebecers
Université Laval alumni
20th-century Canadian male artists
21st-century Canadian male artists
Canadian abstract artists